Brambus Records is a small record label based in Chur, Switzerland. It was founded 1988 by Paul Rostetter. In 2013, Brambus Records celebrated 25 years of existence and his 270th released production. The record label is focused on international folk/songwriter and jazz, especially from Switzerland.

History 

In 1987 the life of Paul Rostetter still pursued its accustomed, and somewhat predictable, course; nine to five employment in a Swiss Bank .... However, hearing the complaints of outstanding musicians performing in Chur, that they could never find a congenial record label, Paul immediately spotted a niche, and blue‐eyed and adventurous, sprang into the wide ocean of sounds which deserved to be heard.

The English Blues‐Rocker Mick Clarke was the catalyst and, after nearly twenty years in banking, it was also high time for the label's founder Paul Rostetter to start thinking about a new direction. That's how it all began:

1988 saw the release of the first Brambus album: Mick Clarke's "West Coast Connection." The label based itself in Chur, in association with the record shop Grammophone Heeb AG, with Paul Rostetter and partner Marcus Heeb as the two‐man management team.

1989 In the following year eight more albums appeared, together with the first foreign contacts and business associates in Europe. Since 1990 Brambus has settled into a moreorless regular pattern of a dozen or so CD releases per year, a realistic maximum target for times when the Record market was already flooded.

1994 Brambus records became independent, ending the previous partnership with Grammophone Heeb. Now on his own, Paul started planning for the future, and was able to enlist the valuable support of the local graphics studio Diro, also based in Chur.

1998 Brambus celebrated its tenth anniversary, and the release of 110 CDs!

Early in 1999 the "BRAMBUS‐CLUB', for Brambus music fans, came into existence. Here, supporters and fans of the label had the chance to make a financial contribution, receiving in return not only cut price albums, but also free tickets, VIP invitations etc. This year witnessed Brambus' 125th production, and also its growing interest in the Swiss Jazz scene.

Since then, and up to 2009: Brambus has come of age, but the transition was seamless and very little has changed. As ever there is work on small tours and bookings; special offers of musical bargains continue to appear, and high quality, but less commercial, music is given an airing. The main emphasis still lies with Folk/Songwriter productions by international artists; but equally with Jazz, where, apart from former Dollar Brand saxophonist Joe Malinga, exclusively Swiss combos ‐ most of them hosting international guests ‐ can be booked. Brambus actively promotes the exciting milieu of young, contemporary Swiss Jazz. Although they are still relatively unknown, internationally, these young bands are at the cutting edge; dynamic, virtuosic and creative.

In the summer of 2009 the 250th Brambus production was released ‐ for the first time a double CD (priced as a single) ‐ and, also for the first time, featuring the spoken word, in German; a translation of Charles Dickens' David Copperfield, in sound and speech.

Notable artists 

 Andy Egert
 Jack Hardy
 Richard Dobson
 Robert Ross
 Rod MacDonald
 Beppe Gambetta
 Peter Frei
 Heiner Althaus
 Thomas Moeckel
 Hugh Moffatt
 Sammy Walker
 Jimmy Johnson
 Daniel Schenker
 Stefan Schlegel
 Tomas Sauter
 Jochen Baldes
 Stephan Urwyler
 Gitta Kahle
 Hugh Blumenfeld
 Rusconi
 Bucky Halker
 
 Marianne Racine
 Eliane Cueni
 Chris Wiesendanger
 Rusconi (Band)
 Theo Kapilidis

External links
 https://web.archive.org/web/20140517025531/http://brambus.com/

Swiss record labels